Christopher John Bradshaw (May 20, 1944 – November 3, 2018) was a Canadian politician and businessman. He served as interim leader of the Green Party of Canada from 2001 to 2003, and has sought public office as a candidate of the Green Party of Canada and the Green Party of Ontario.

Business

Bradshaw has a Bachelor of Arts degree in political science, and worked for General Motors of Canada following his graduation. He subsequently moved to Ottawa, Ontario, where he worked in a low-income community with the Company of Young Canadians, then as executive director of the CMHC-funded Canadian Organization of Public Housing Tenants, and then for 22 years as community relations specialist for the Planning Department of the Regional Municipality of Ottawa–Carleton, retiring in 1995. He then co-founded Vrtucar, a car-sharing service in Ottawa, in May 2000, but sold his share to his partner in late 2006.  The company continues to grow.

Advocacy 
In 1988, he started Ottawalk, the first pedestrian advocacy group in the continent. He was recognized by America Walks in 2001 as the "father of pedestrian advocacy in North America."

Politics

In February 2001, Bradshaw was appointed interim leader of the federal Green Party, via election by the board. Bradshaw helped organize the 2003 Green Party Leadership Convention in Ottawa, and was responsible for moving the party's central office to Ottawa from Toronto. In February 2003, he was succeeded as party leader by Jim Harris.  At the 2002 national convention in Montreal, he was elected leader, with the understanding that the post would be filled on a more permanent basis in early 2003 via mail-in ballots.

Bradshaw ran for public office in the Ontario provincial election of 1999, receiving 1,231 votes in Ottawa Centre. In the 2003 election, he finished fourth with 3,821 votes (7.75%) in the same riding, the highest vote percentage of any Green Party candidate in the province.

Federally, Bradshaw first ran for office in the general election of 2000. Again campaigning in Ottawa Centre, he received 1529 votes for a fifth-place finish. In 2002, while serving as party leader, he contested a by-election in Bonavista—Trinity—Conception, Newfoundland but received only 139 votes. Bradshaw ran in Newfoundland in an effort to foster a genuinely national party: there has been a history of division between the Terra Nova Green Party, which is the Newfoundland & Labrador Green Party Association, and the federal Green Party.

In the 2004 federal election, Bradshaw campaigned in the rural St. Lawrence Valley riding of Leeds—Grenville, replacing Jerry Heath who unexpectedly declined to run. Despite the last-minute substitution, Bradshaw received 5.5% of the votes cast (2,722), a significant improvement over the Green Party's previous 1.73%.

References

1944 births
2018 deaths
Ontario candidates for Member of Parliament
Green Party of Canada candidates in the 2000 Canadian federal election
Green Party of Canada candidates in the 2004 Canadian federal election
Green Party of Canada leaders
Politicians from Ottawa
Politicians from Vancouver
Businesspeople from Ottawa
Businesspeople from Vancouver
Green Party of Ontario candidates in Ontario provincial elections
Sustainable transport pioneers